The North Atlantic Rail is a proposed high-speed railway to connect New York City to Boston in one hour, 40 minutes. The proposed railway would run across Long Island and tunnel under the Long Island Sound. The project, consisting of two phases, is estimated to cost a total of $105 billion, which would be among the most expensive public works projects in United States history, and take 20 years to complete.

The first phase, costing $23.5B, would:

 Modernize the New Haven Line from New Haven to Manhattan, completing improvements to make the journey time shorter
 Complete the East-West rail link between Boston and Springfield, Massachusetts
 Double track and electrify the Danbury and Waterbury branches, as well as the Hartford Line in Connecticut
 Extend the Danbury Branch to Pittsfield, Massachusetts
 Modernize LIRR service between on the Oyster Bay and Greenport branches
 Create a new electrified commuter rail line from Concord, New Hampshire, to Boston
 Create fast and frequent high speed rail service between Kingston, Rhode Island, and Boston
 Upgrade the Valley Flyer from Springfield, Massachusetts, to Brattleboro, Vermont
 Electrify the Newburyport/Rockport, Haverhill, Fairmount and Lowell Lines in Massachusetts

References

Further reading

External links 
 

Proposed railway lines in New York (state)
Proposed railway lines in Massachusetts
Proposed railway lines in the United States
High-speed railway lines in the United States